Darryl T. Owens (November 10, 1937 – January 4, 2022) was an American politician who was a Democratic Party member of the Kentucky House of Representatives, representing District 43 from 2005 to 2019. Owens retired from the House in 2018. He died on January 4, 2022, at the age of 84.

Early life and education 
Owens was born in 1937 in Louisville, Kentucky. He graduated from Central High School in Louisville and earned a bachelor's degree from Central State University in Wilberforce, Ohio. Owen earned a juris doctor degree from Howard University Law School in 1962.

Career

Legal 
Starting in 1965, Owen practiced civil and criminal law in Louisville. From 1965 to 1969, he served as the first African American assistant prosecutor of Louisville police court, and he was the first African American in Kentucky to hold the position of  Assistant  Attorney General. Uwens also served on the Jefferson County Fiscal Court. He also served as a Jefferson County commissioner. He was also the first African American to serve on the fiscal court and county commission in Kentucky.

References

External links
Representative Darryl Owens official Kentucky Legislature site (archived)
Darryl Owens official constituency site

1937 births
2022 deaths
21st-century American politicians
Central High School (Louisville, Kentucky) alumni
Central State University alumni
Howard University alumni
African-American state legislators in Kentucky
Democratic Party members of the Kentucky House of Representatives
County commissioners in Kentucky
Politicians from Louisville, Kentucky
Lawyers from Louisville, Kentucky